Harold Turner Matthews (7 December 1902 – 29 August 1986) was an Australian rules footballer who played with St Kilda in the VFL.

A defender, Matthews was the joint winner of the St Kilda Best Player award in 1926 and won it again the following season. In 1931 he finished equal 9th in the Brownlow Medal count.

References

External links 
 
 
 Harold Matthews' playing statistics from The VFA Project

1902 births
Australian rules footballers from Melbourne
St Kilda Football Club players
Brighton Football Club players
1986 deaths
People from Brighton, Victoria